Blood Sword may refer to:

Blood Sword (gamebook series)
Chinese Hero: Tales of the Blood Sword, a wuxia manhua series created by Hong Kong artist Ma Wing-shing
The Blood Sword, a Hong Kong television series based on the manhua
The Blood Sword 2, a Hong Kong television series based on the manhua
Songs of Blood and Sword, a memoir by Fatima Bhutto